Microalbuminuria is a term to describe a moderate increase in the level of urine albumin. It occurs when the kidney leaks small amounts of albumin into the urine, in other words, when an abnormally high permeability for albumin in the glomerulus of the kidney occurs. Normally, the kidneys filter albumin, so if albumin is found in the urine, then it is a marker of kidney disease. The term microalbuminuria is now discouraged by Kidney Disease Improving Global Outcomes and has been replaced by moderately increased albuminuria.

Causes 
Higher dietary intake of animal protein, animal fat, and cholesterol may increase risk for microalbuminuria, and generally, diets higher in fruits, vegetables, and whole grains but lower in meat and sweets may be protective against kidney function decline.

Associations
 Marker of vascular endothelial dysfunction
 An important prognostic marker for kidney disease
 in diabetes mellitus
 in hypertension
 in post-streptococcal glomerulonephritis
 Increasing microalbuminuria during the first 48 hours after admission to an intensive care unit predicts elevated risk for acute respiratory failure, multiple organ failure, and overall mortality
 A risk factor for venous thromboembolism

Microalbuminuria is an important adverse predictor of glycemic outcomes in prediabetes. Prediabetes individuals with increased microalbuminuria even in the so-called normal range is associated with increased progression to diabetes and decreased reversal to normoglycemia. Hence, prediabetes individuals with microalbuminuria warrant more aggressive intervention to prevent diabetes in them.

Diagnosis and treatment
The level of albumin protein produced by microalbuminuria can be detected by special albumin-specific urine dipsticks, which have a lower detection threshold than standard urine dipsticks. A microalbumin urine test determines the presence of the albumin in urine. In a properly functioning body, albumin is not normally present in urine because it is retained in the bloodstream by the kidneys.

Microalbuminuria can be diagnosed from a 24-hour urine collection (between 30 and 300 mg/24 hours) or, more commonly, from elevated concentration in a spot sample (20 to 200 mg/L).  Both must be measured on at least two of three measurements over a two- to three-month period.

An albumin level above the upper limit values is called "macroalbuminuria", or sometimes just albuminuria. Sometimes, the upper limit value is given as one less (such as 300 being given as 299) to mark that the higher value (here 300) is defined as macroalbuminuria.

Taurine in combination with N-acetylcysteine (Nefrosave Tablet) was useful in attenuating UACR in microalbuminuric type 2 diabetic patient as per Indian Journal of Nephrology 2008

To compensate for variations in urine concentration in spot-check samples, comparing the amount of albumin in the sample against its concentration of creatinine is helpful. This is termed the albumin/creatinine ratio (ACR) and microalbuminuria is defined as ACR ≥3.5 mg/mmol (female) or ≥2.5 mg/mmol (male), or with both substances measured by mass, as an ACR between 30 and 300 µg albumin/mg creatinine.
For the diagnosis of microalbuminuria, care must be taken when collecting sample for the urine ACR. An early-morning sample is preferred. The patient should refrain from heavy exercises 24 hours before the test. A repeat test should be done 3 to 6 months after the first positive test for microalbuminuria. Lastly, the test is inaccurate in a person with too much or too little muscle mass. This is due to the variation in creatinine level which is produced by the muscle.

References
 
 
 
 
 
 
 Kidney Disease: Improving Global Outcomes (KDIGO) CKD Work Group. KDIGO 2012 Clinical Practice Guideline for the Evaluation and Management of Chronic Kidney Disease. Kidney inter., Suppl. 2013; 3: 1–150.

Footnotes

External links 

 Microalbumin and Urine Albumin/Creatinine Ratio – Lab Tests Online
 

Abnormal clinical and laboratory findings for urine